The Dream Car is a 1934 Hungarian romantic comedy film directed by Béla Gaál and starring Zita Perczel, Ella Gombaszögi and Klári Tolnay. A tycoon falls in love with a poor woman and secretly buys her a car. The 1935 British film Car of Dreams was based on this film.

Cast
 Zita Perczel as Kovács Vera 
 Ella Gombaszögi as Kerekes Anna 
 Klári Tolnay as Sári 
 Jenő Törzs as Szûcs János bankigazgató 
 Gyula Kabos as Halmos Aladár 
 Lili Berky as Kovács Mother
 Gyula Gózon as Kovács Father
 Vilmos Komlós as Hentes 
 Jenő Herczeg as Péterffy 
 Sándor Pethes as Józsi,a sofõr
 Lajos Sugár as Szállópincér 
 Gusztáv Vándory as Pincér 
 Zoltán Várkonyi as Autóüzleti alkalmazott 
 Tibor Weygand as Éneklõ fiatal 
 Ede Hilbert as Child
 Lenke Szőnyi as Elhagyott kedves

References

Bibliography
 Burns, Bryan. World Cinema: Hungary. Fairleigh Dickinson Univ Press, 1996. 
 Reid, John Howard. Science-fiction & Fantasy Cinema: Classic Films of Horror, Sci-fi & The Supernatural. 2007.

External links

1934 films
1930s Hungarian-language films
1934 romantic comedy films
Hungarian romantic comedy films
Hungarian black-and-white films